Rokas Zaveckas (born 15 April 1996 in Vilnius, Lithuania) is a Lithuanian alpine and freestyle skier.

In 2012 he competed at 2012 Winter Youth Olympics: 24th in slalom, 28th in super combined, 29th in giant slalom and 35th in Super-G.

In 2014 Zaveckas was selected to represent Lithuania in 2014 Winter Olympic Games.

In 2023 Zaveckas become first Lithuanian to compete at the FIS Freestyle Ski World Championships 2023.

References

External links
 
 
 
 
 

1996 births
Living people
Lithuanian male alpine skiers
Lithuanian male freestyle skiers
Olympic alpine skiers of Lithuania
Alpine skiers at the 2014 Winter Olympics
Alpine skiers at the 2012 Winter Youth Olympics
Competitors at the 2017 Winter Universiade
Sportspeople from Vilnius